Alikadić is a Bosnian surname, derived from Turkish Ali Kadı. Notable people with the surname include:

Amar Alikadić (born 1998), Bosnian footballer
Bisera Alikadić (born 1939), Bosnian poet and writer
 (1896-1941), NDH general

Bosnian surnames